A tres leches cake (or ), also known as pan tres leches or simply tres leches, is a sponge cake—soaked in three kinds of milk: evaporated milk, condensed milk, and whole milk. 

Tres leches is a very light cake, with many air bubbles. This distinct texture is why it does not have a soggy consistency, despite being soaked in a mixture of three types of milk.

Popularity and origins
Tres leches cake is a uniquely traditional Latin American cake. It can be found all across Latin America, especially so in Central American countries such as Mexico, Cuba, El Salvador, Venezuela, Puerto Rico, and Nicaragua, which all claim an origin to the cake.

Recipes for soaked-cake desserts were seen in Latin America as early as the 19th century, in countries like El Salvador, likely a result of the large cross-cultural transfer which took place between Europe and the Americas. Nicaragua is one of the countries where tres leches cake has become popular. The cake is popular in Central and South America, North America, and many parts of the Caribbean, Canary Islands, as well as in Albania, Serbia, North Macedonia, and some other parts of Europe.

In the US, the cake first became popular in the 1980s beginning in Miami due to Latin American immigration. The popularity then spread across the US, possibly from Los Ranchos restaurant in Miami, which featured it on its menu when it opened in 1981. The cake was so popular from Los Ranchos, that it was featured its recipe on fliers, which were pervasively distributed. Cookbook The Joy of Cooking included a recipe for tres leches in the 1997 edition.

Variations
A variety of tres leches known as trileçe (A caramel topped version of tres leches)  became popular in the Balkans and Turkey around 2015. One theory is that the popularity of Brazilian soap operas in Albania led local chefs to reverse-engineer the dessert, which then spread to Turkey. The Albanian version is sometimes made literally with three milks: cow's, goat's and water buffalo's, though more commonly a mixture of cow's milk and cream is used.

References

Cakes
Costa Rican cuisine
Cuban cuisine
Albanian cuisine
Macedonian cuisine
Spanish desserts
Turkish desserts
Latin American cuisine
Mexican desserts
Nicaraguan cuisine
Puerto Rican cuisine
Salvadoran cuisine
Venezuelan cuisine
Milk dishes